The Kirksville Micropolitan Statistical Area, as defined by the United States Census Bureau, is an area consisting of two counties in Missouri, anchored by the city of Kirksville. As of the 2000 census, the μSA had a population of 29,147, and in the 2010 census the population was 30,008.

Counties
Adair
Schuyler

Communities

Places more than 15,000 inhabitants
Kirksville (Principal city) Pop: 17,505

Places less than 1,000 inhabitants
Lancaster Pop: 728
Queen City Pop: 598
Novinger Pop: 456
Greentop Pop: 442
Downing Pop: 335
Brashear Pop: 273
Glenwood Pop: 196
Gibbs Pop: 107
Millard Pop: 89

Unincorporated places
Coatsville
Yarrow

Townships

Adair County

Schuyler County

Demographics
As of the census of 2000, there were 29,147 people, 11,394 households, and 6,539 families residing within the μSA. The racial makeup of the μSA was 96.19% White, 1.03% African American, 0.26% Native American, 1.21% Asian, 0.04% Pacific Islander, 0.38% from other races, and 0.87% from two or more races. Hispanic or Latino of any race were 1.17% of the population.

The median income for a household in the μSA was $27,031, and the median income for a family was $36,325. Males had a median income of $25,974 versus $20,283 for females. The per capita income for the μSA was $15,667.

Education
There are five public school districts that serve the micropolitan area:
 Adair County R-I (Novinger) (K-12)
 Adair County R-II (Brashear) (K-12)
 Kirksville R-III (K-12)
 La Plata R-II (La Plata) (K-12) **Serves a small portion of southern Adair County, though the school district facilities are in Macon County, Missouri.
 Schuyler County R-1 (K-12)

See also
Missouri census statistical areas
United States micropolitan area

References

http://www.census.gov/

 
Geography of Adair County, Missouri
Geography of Schuyler County, Missouri
Micropolitan areas of Missouri